David Harold Waller (born 20 December 1963 in Urmston, Lancashire) is an English former professional footballer who played in the Football League, as a forward for clubs including Crewe Alexandra, Shrewsbury Town and Chesterfield.

Career
Waller signed a professional contract at Crewe in 1982. After scoring 55 goals in four season at Gresty Road, he was sold to Shrewsbury for £20,000 in 1986, but suffered an injury soon after, and was sold for £3,000 to Chesterfield, becoming the last player signed by John Duncan during his first spell in charge.
 
Waller scored 37 goals in his first two seasons at Chesterfield; in the 1988–89 season he equalled Jimmy Cookson's feat of scoring in eight successive League games. However, he suffered a serious cruciate ligament injury during the following season (his 16 league goals still made him the club's leading scorer), and eventually left the club, playing for non-league teams while running a stall on Chesterfield's market. He was player/manager at Glapwell in 1993, and retired from football at the end of the 1997–1998 season.

References

External links

1963 births
Living people
People from Urmston
English footballers
Association football forwards
Crewe Alexandra F.C. players
Shrewsbury Town F.C. players
Chesterfield F.C. players
Kettering Town F.C. players
Worksop Town F.C. players
Glapwell F.C. players
Congleton Town F.C. players
English Football League players
National League (English football) players